Saša Petrović (2 January 1962 – 27 January 2023) was a Bosnian actor. He won the Heart of Sarajevo for best actor in 2007 for It's Hard to be Nice. He was also one of the founding members of the Sarajevo rock band SCH.

Filmography
 Top lista nadrealista (TV show) — 1992–1994
 No Man's Land — 2001
 Fuse — 2003
 Nafaka — 2006
 It’s Hard to be Nice — 2007
 Lud, zbunjen, normalan (2007–09)

References

External links
 

1962 births
2023 deaths
Male actors from Sarajevo
Serbs of Bosnia and Herzegovina
Bosnia and Herzegovina male actors
Bosnia and Herzegovina male film actors
20th-century Bosnia and Herzegovina male actors
21st-century Bosnia and Herzegovina male actors